Nothing Is Impossible is the first album of praise and worship for children from the Planetshakers Church. Planetshakers through their social networks announced the release of their first children's album on November 19, 2013. 
Nothing Is Impossible was released by Planetshakers Ministries International, Crossroad and Integrity Music.

Artwork
Paul Orton, Cover Designer, Creative Artist and Children's Pastor of Planetshakers Church in Melbourne, shared the Planetshakers Kids album artwork on his social media. The final cover of the album is a photo of a boy standing on top of the ice looking up at the clear sky next to a purple flag. Orton also shared the artwork from the album Nothing Is Impossible on his blog.

Critical reception

Marc Daniel Rivera, awarding the album gave it a 4.6 stars rating from Kristiya Know, says, "Overall, this record, with its songs, scripture readings plus prayers, gives the children a unique opportunity to worship God while impressing in their hearts the hunger for worship and for more of Jesus in spite of their age." A staff editor at Amazon.com gave the album a relatively positive review, writing, "The music from Planetshakers Kids provides Christ-centered, positive and uplifting music for the whole family. It is music any Christian kid would want to give their friends, because it is just as cool as what they might hear on the radio or TV."

Awards and accolades
In the 2014, the album Nothing Is Impossible was nominated for a Dove Award in the category: "Children's Music Album of the Year" at the 45th Annual GMA Dove Awards.

Track listing

Personnel

Vocals
 Jonathan Hunt
 Chelsi Nikkerud 
 Aimee Evans

Kids Choir Vocalists
 Beverly Carter
 Taylor Carter
 Savannah Schrieber
 Emily Eisa
 Marissa Eisa
 Matthew Daniel
 Kenneth Eakins
 David Anleu
 Chris Beadle
 Gerald Hornbuckle
 Celia Kate Mellett
 Preston Beard
 María Flores
 Katie Allin
 Hannah Johnson
 Jonathan Brown
 Neema Andrews
 Joel Mangosteen
 Kayla Culbreath
 Jude Beard
 Gabriella Quintanilla
 Makayla Tubbs
 Celeste Chapa
 Julián Chapa
 Haler Bringham
 Jonathan Martínez
 Mahely Martínez
 Lia Doherty 
 Seattle Nilsson
 Victoria Marin
 Aiden Mellett
 Gracie Mellett
 Abel George
 Aída George
 Abigail Savage
 Caleb Savage
 Sela Thiessen
 Colin Mellet
 Addison Hurst
 Aubrey Hurst
 Christian Thiessen
 Gracen Beard
 Emily Martiniez 
 Seanie B Mellett

Prayers
 Jenibelle Font
 Nemue Hernández
 Sole Lugo Carrillo
 Grace Estefanía Gutarra
 Avril Marie Mejía
 Estefanía Fernández Acosta
 Gabriel Emilo Figueroa
 Lyangie Fontanet Zayas
 Raquel Méndez 
 Jesús David Gil
 Paola Burgos
 Sole Lugo

Prayers & Bible Readings
 Thaddeus Owl
 Emilie Hughes
 Evans Hughes 
 Amy Ferguson
 Jodeci Tofete
 Rachel Kunnumpurath
 Eliah Chekole

A&R
 Joshua Brown
 Steve Merkel

Artist development
 Craig Dunnagan

Mixing
 Ainslie Grosser at Experientia Studio, Franklin, Tennessee
 Joth Hunt, mixed the song (We Cry Out) at Planetshakers Studios, Melbourne, Australia

Mastering
 Dan Snike at Tone and Volume Mastering

Programming
 Josh Ham
 Joth Hunt

Guitars and Keyboards 
 Joth Hunt
 Josh Ham

Artwork (cover design)
 Paul Orton

Production Coordinator
 Beca Nicholson

Kids Choir Vocal Producer
 Michael Mellet 
 Aimee Beard

Kids Choir Recording Engineers
 BK "chizzle" Beard
 Casey "sunshine" Graham

Vocal producer
 Steve Merkel

Producers
 Joth Hunt
 Josh Ham

Executive producers
 Russell & Sam Evans
 C. Ryan Dunham

References

2013 albums
Planetshakers albums